Ortgiesia is a subgenus of the genus Aechmea.

Species
Species accepted by Encyclopedia of Bromeliads as of October 2022:

References

Plant subgenera